The 1989–90 OHL season was the tenth season of the Ontario Hockey League. The Toronto Marlboros become the Dukes of Hamilton. The Guelph Platers become the Owen Sound Platers. The Kingston Raiders are renamed the Kingston Frontenacs. The OHL Executive of the Year award is inaugurated. Fifteen teams each played 66 games. The Oshawa Generals won the J. Ross Robertson Cup, defeating the Kitchener Rangers.

Relocation/Team Name Change

Guelph Platers to Owen Sound Platers

The Guelph Platers relocated to the city of Owen Sound during the off-season as the ownership group, the Holody family, could not get a new arena built.

The club kept the Platers named and would be known as the Owen Sound Platers. The team would play out of the Bayshore Community Centre. During their years in Guelph from 1982 to 1989, the Platers won the Memorial Cup in 1986. Owen Sound would continue to play out of the Emms Division.

Toronto Marlboros to Hamilton Dukes

The Toronto Marlboros relocated to the city of Hamilton and were renamed as the Dukes of Hamilton. The Marlboros had a long history in Toronto, playing from 1904 to 1989. The Marlboros won the Memorial Cup seven times, the most recent being in 1975.

The Dukes would play out of Copps Coliseum and remain in the Leyden Division.

Kingston Raiders to Kingston Frontenacs

The Kingston Raiders were rebranded as the Kingston Frontenacs as the club was sold a new ownership group, including Wren Blair, Don Anderson, and Bob Attersley, keeping the team in Kingston.

The club previously played as the Kingston Canadians from 1973 to 1988 before being renamed as the Raiders for the 1988-89 season. Kingston changed their colour scheme from black, silver and white to yellow, black and white.

Windsor Compuware Spitfires to Windsor Spitfires
The Windsor Compuware Spitfires were sold by Peter Karmanos to local construction magnate Steve Riolo during the off-season, and reverted to their original team name, the Windsor Spitfires.

The Spitfires introduced a new logo and colour scheme.

Regular season

Final standings
Note: GP = Games played; W = Wins; L = Losses; T = Ties; GF = Goals for; GA = Goals against; PTS = Points; x = clinched playoff berth; y = clinched division title

Leyden Division

Emms Division

Scoring leaders

Playoffs

Division quarter-finals

Leyden Division

(1) Oshawa Generals vs. (6) Cornwall Royals

(2) Kingston Frontenacs vs. (5) Belleville Bulls

(3) Peterborough Petes vs. (4) Ottawa 67's

Emms Division

(1) London Knights vs. (6) Niagara Falls Thunder

(2) Kitchener Rangers vs. (5) North Bay Centennials

(3) Sudbury Wolves vs. (4) Owen Sound Platers

Division semi-finals

Leyden Division

(3) Peterborough Petes vs. (5) Belleville Bulls

Emms Division

(4) Owen Sound Platers vs. (6) Niagara Falls Thunder

Division finals

Leyden Division

(1) Oshawa Generals vs. (3) Peterborough Petes

Emms Division

(2) Kitchener Rangers vs. (6) Niagara Falls Thunder

J. Ross Robertson Cup

(L1) Oshawa Generals vs. (E2) Kitchener Rangers

Awards

1990 OHL Priority Selection
The Detroit Compuware Ambassadors held the first overall pick in the 1990 Ontario Priority Selection and selected Pat Peake from the Detroit Compuware Ambassadors. Peake was awarded the Jack Ferguson Award, awarded to the top pick in the draft.

Below are the players who were selected in the first round of the 1990 Ontario Hockey League Priority Selection.

See also
List of OHA Junior A standings
List of OHL seasons
1990 Memorial Cup
1990 NHL Entry Draft
1989 in sports
1990 in sports

References

HockeyDB

Ontario Hockey League seasons
OHL